The Cenozoic Research Laboratory of the Geological Survey of China was established within the Peking Union Medical College in 1928 by Canadian paleoanthropologist Davidson Black and Chinese geologists Ding Wenjing and Weng Wenhao for the research and appraisal of Peking Man fossils unearthed at Zhoukoudian.

History
Davidson Black founded the laboratory with an $80,000 grant from the Rockefeller Foundation and  stayed on as honorary director until he died in his office, surrounded by his finds, in 1934. He was replaced by German Jewish anthropologist Franz Weidenreich.

Excavations at Zhoukoudian ceased in 1937 with the Japanese occupation and the fossils from the site were locked in the laboratory safe under the assumption that they would be secure at the American-run hospital.

However, in the summer of 1941, fearing imminent war between America and Japan, Weidenreich ordered copies of the bones to be made. When this task had been completed secretary Hu Chengzi packed up the fossils so they could be shipped to the U.S. for safekeeping until the end of the war. They were never seen again.

Now only Weidenreich's timely copies and the research notes of the staff remain to demonstrate the pioneering work of this laboratory that is considered to be the precursor of the modern Institute of Vertebrate Paleontology and Paleoanthropology (IVPP) of the Chinese Academy of Science.

Staff
 Bian Mienmien joined in 1931 and undertook excavations at Zhokoudian until they ceased in 1937.
 Davidson Black founded the laboratory in 1928 and served as its honorary director until he died at his desk in 1934.
Ding Wenjing assisted in the founding of the laboratory and served as honorary director in its early years.
Jia Lanpo joined in 1931 and took over the running of the excavations at Zhoukoudian from 1935-37.
Pei Wenzhong joined in 1928, took over the running of the excavations at Zhoukoudian from 1933-34, and returned in 1937.
Pierre Teilhard de Chardin worked as a consultant from its foundation.
Franz Weidenreich appointed honorary director in 1935 following Black's death.
Yang Zhongjian took over the running of the excavations at Zhoukoudian from 1928 to 1933.

References

External links
 Division of Cenozoic Geology and Environment, IGGCAS

Earth science research institutes
Research institutes in China
Research institutes established in 1926